Martins is a Portuguese surname. Its Spanish variant is Martínez. Notable people with the surname include:

Abraão Lincoln Martins (born 1983), Brazilian striker
Adriano Martins (born 1982), Brazilian mixed martial artist
Adriano Ferreira Martins (born 1982), Brazilian footballer
Alberto Martins (born 1945), Portuguese lawyer and politician
Aldemir Martins (1922–2006), Brazilian artist
Alex Martins (born 1964), American sports executive
Alex Martins (futsal player) (born 1980), Brazilian former futsal player
Alvaro Martins (footballer) (1901–?), Brazilian footballer
Ana Martins (born 1972), Angolan swimmer
Ana Filipa Martins (born 1996), Portuguese female artistic gymnast
Ana Maria Guerra Martins (born 1963), Portuguese jurist and judge
Anderson Martins (born 1987), Brazilian footballer
André Martins (footballer, born 1987) (born 1987), Portuguese former footballer
André Martins (footballer, born 1989) (born 1989), Portuguese footballer
André Martins (footballer, born 1990) (born 1990), Portuguese footballer
Ângelo Martins (1930–2020), Portuguese footballer
António Martins (footballer) (1913–?), Portuguese footballer
António Martins (sport shooter, born 1892) (born 1892), Portuguese former sports shooter
António Martins (sport shooter, born 1930) (born 1930), Portuguese former sports shooter
António Alves Martins (1808–1882), Portuguese bishop
Armando Martins (1905–?), Portuguese footballer
Aurélio Martins (born 1966), São Toméan journalist, businessman and politician
Avelino Martins (1905–1982), Portuguese footballer
Beatriz Martins (born 1994), Portuguese trampoline gymnast
Ben Martins (born 1956), South African former politician
Bernardo Martins (born 1997), Portuguese former footballer
Bruno Martins Indi (born 1992), Portuguese-born Dutch footballer
Caio Vianna Martins (1923–1938), Brazilian Scout
Carlos Martins (musician) (born 1961), Portuguese saxophonist, jazz musician and composer
Carlos Martins (footballer) (born 1982), Portuguese former footballer
Carlos Wizard Martins (born 1956), Brazilian entrepreneur and founder of Gurpo Multi
Caroline Martins (born 1992), Brazilian handball player
Catarina Martins (born 1973), member of the Parliament of Portugal
César Henrique Martins (born 1992), Brazilian footballer
Charles Frédéric Martins (1806–1889), French physician, botanist, geologist and translator
Chineme Martins (1997–2020), Nigerian footballer
Christopher Martins (born 1997), Luxembourgish footballer
Corentin Martins (born 1969), French footballer
Cristina Martins (born ?), Portuguese-Canadian former politician
Dan Martins (born 1951), American Anglican bishop
Daniel Martins (athlete), Brazilian Paralympic athlete
Daniel Martins (Portuguese footballer) (born 1993), Portuguese footballer
Daniel Martins (footballer, born 1972) (born 1972), Brazilian former footballer
David Martins (born 1930), Guyanese cricketer
Danilo Monteiro Martins (born 1998), Brazilian basketball player
Dênio Martins (born 1977), Brazilian footballer
Dénis Martins (born 1997), Portuguese footballer
Dhiego Martins (born 1988), Brazilian footballer
Diego Martins (born 1983), Brazilian footballer
Diego Jota Martins (born 1987), Brazilian footballer
Edgar Martins (born 1977), Portuguese photographer and author
Edgar Martins (swimmer) (born ?), Mozambican swimmer
Edson Martins (born 1989), Brazilian bobsledder
Édson Campos Martins (1930–1991), Brazilian footballer
Eduardo Ramos Martins (born 1986), Brazilian footballer
Edward Martins (born 1933), Liberian sprinter
Eliane Martins (born 1986), Brazilian long jumper
Élio Martins (born 1985), Portuguese footballer
Eric Martins (born 1972), American baseball coach
Erivelto Martins (born 1954), Brazilian former footballer
Fabinho Martins (born 1996), Portuguese footballer
Fábio Martins (born 1993), Portuguese footballer
Felipe Martins (born 1990), Brazilian footballer
Felipe Campanholi Martins (born 1990), Brazilian footballer
Felipe Trevizan Martins (born 1987), Brazilian footballer
Fernanda Martins (born 1988), Brazilian athlete
Fernando Martins (born 1952), Brazilian boxer
Fernando Lucas Martins (born 1992), Brazilian footballer
Filipa Martins (athlete) (born 1992), Portuguese sprinter
Franklin Martins (born 1948), Brazilian journalist
Fred Martins (born 1988), Nigerian artist
Gabi Martins (born 1996), Brazilian singer
Gaspar Martins (born 1940), Angolan ambassador
Gelson Martins (born 1995), Portuguese footballer
Geraldo Martins (born ?), Bissau-Guinean economist and politician
Geraldo Antônio Martins (1940–2018), Brazilian footballer
Glan Martins (born 1996), Indian footballer
Guilherme d'Oliveira Martins (born 1952), Portuguese lawyer and politician
Helvécio Martins (1930–2005), first person of Black African descent to be called as a general authority of LDS Church
Henrique Martins (born 1991), Brazilian swimmer
Henrique Wilsons Da Cruz Martins (born 1997), Timor-Leste footballer
Herivelto Martins (1912–1992), Brazilian composer, singer and music player
Humberto Martins (born 1961), Brazilian actor
Ingrid Gamarra Martins (born 1996), Brazilian tennis player
Isabel Martins (?–?), Mozambican politician
Ismael Martins (born 1940), Angolan diplomat and political figure
Jack Martins (born 1967), American attorney and former New York State Senator
Janício Martins (born 1979), Cape Verdean footballer
Jean-Pierre Martins (born 1971), French actor and musician
Jennifer Martins (born 1989), Canadian rower
João Martins (footballer, born 1927) (born 1927), Portuguese former footballer
João Martins (footballer, born 1982) (born 1982), Angolan footballer
João Martins (footballer, born 1988) (born 1988), Portuguese former footballer
João Carlos Martins (born 1940), Brazilian pianist
João Cleófas Martins (1901–1970), Cape Verdean photographer and humorist
João Luís Martins (born 1967), Portuguese football coach and former footballer
Joaquim Pedro de Oliveira Martins (1845–1894), Portuguese writer
Joel Antônio Martins (1931–2003), Brazilian footballer
Johan Martins (?–?), Galician clergyman
John Martins (boxer) (born 1950), Nigerian boxer
Jorge Luiz Thais Martins (born 1954), Brazilian serial killer
José Eduardo Martins (pianist) (born 1938), Brazilian concert pianist
José Eduardo Martins (politician) (born 1969), Portuguese lawyer and politician
José Freitas Martins (born 1951), Portuguese former cyclist
José Maria da Cruz Martins (born 1973), São Toméan football manager
José Martins (footballer, born 1906) (1906–1994), Portuguese footballer
José Martins (boxer) (born 1931), Brazilian former boxer
José Gouveia Martins (1930–2015), Portuguese footballer
José Saraiva Martins (born 1932), Portuguese Cardinal of the Roman Catholic Church
José Tomás de Sousa Martins (1843–1897), Portuguese doctor
Josimar da Silva Martins (born 1984), Brazilian footballer
Jovel Martins (born 1990), Indian footballer
Juliana Martins (born 1984), Brazilian model
Juliana Martins (actress) (born 1974), Brazilian actress
Juliano Pescarolo Martins (born 1974), Brazilian footballer
Júlio César Martins (born 1978), Brazilian footballer
Júlio César Oliveira Martins (born 1983), Brazilian footballer
Júlio Oliveira Martins (born 1983), Brazilian footballer
Kaio Magno Bacelar Martins (born 1999), Brazilian footballer
Kunle Martins (born 1980), American artist
Lasier Martins (born 1942), Brazilian politician and journalist
Lauriela Martins (born 1998), Angolan model and beauty pageant titleholder
Lavina Martins (born 1993), Kenyan badminton player
Leandro Barreiro Martins (born 2000), Luxembourgish footballer
Li Martins (born 1984), Brazilian singer
Lima Duarte (born 1930), Brazilian actor
Lorraine Martins (born 2000), Brazilian sprinter
Lourenço Martins (born 1997), Portuguese volleyball player
Lucas Martins (born 1988), Brazilian mixed martial artist
Lucas Matos Martins (born 1997), Brazilian footballer
Luís Martins (footballer, born 1963) (born 1963), Portuguese football coach
Luís Martins (footballer, born June 1992) (born 1992), Portuguese footballer
Luís Martins (footballer, born October 1992) (born 1992), Portuguese footballer
Luís Carlos Martins (born 1955), Brazilian football manager
Luis Felipe Hungria Martins (born 2001), Brazilian footballer
Luís Miguel Fontes Martins (born 1972), Portuguese footballer
Luís Paixão Martins (born 1954), Portuguese communication and public relations consultant
Luiz Martins (born 1917–?), Brazilian sports shooter
Márcio Martins (born 1980), Brazilian footballer
Manuel Martins (1911–1979), Brazilian artist
Manuel António Martins (1772–1845), Portuguese businessman and colonial governor of Cape Verde and Portuguese Guinea
Manuel da Silva Martins (1927–2017), Portuguese Catholic bishop
Mariana Martins (born 1983), Brazilian judoka
Marco Martins (born 1972), Portuguese Film and Theatre director
Marco Martins (fencer) (born 1973), Brazilian fencer
Marcus Martins (born 1959), Brazilian priest
Margarida Martins (born 1953), Portuguese social activist and politician
Maria Martins (athlete) (born 1974), French middle distance runner
Maria Martins (artist) (1894–1973), Brazilian sculptor, designer, writer, painter, writer and musician
Maria Martins (cyclist) (born 1999), Portuguese cyclist
Mark S. Martins (born 1960), Brigadier General in the United States Army Judge Advocate General's Corps
Mateus Cardoso Lemos Martins (born 2000), Brazilian footballer
Mateus Gonçalves Martins (born 1994), Brazilian footballer
Nathalia Pinheiro Felipe Martins (born 1990), Brazilian model and actress
Nelia Martins (born 1998), East Timorese middle-distance runner
Nilas Martins (born 1967), Danish ballet dancer
Obafemi Martins (born 1984), Nigerian footballer
Oladipupo Martins (1983–2011), Nigerian footballer
Olivia Nicole Martins (born 1991), Canadian ice dancer
Olly Martins (born 1969), British politician
Orlando Martins (1899–1985), Nigerian film and stage actor
Ovídio Martins (1928–1999), Cape Verdean poet
Paulo Martins (born 1970), Portuguese wrestler
Paulo César Silva Martins (born 1991), Brazilian footballer
Paulo Eduardo Martins (born 1981), Brazilian politician and journalist
Pedro Henrique Martins (born 1985), Brazilian footballer
Pedro Martins (footballer) (born 1970), Portuguese footballer manager and former footballer
Pedro Martins (badminton) (born 1990), Portuguese badminton player
Pedro Martins (racewalker) (born 1968), Portuguese race walker
Pedro Martins, Lord of the Tower of Vasconcelos (1160–?), Portuguese noble knight
Peter Martins (born 1946), Danish New York City Ballet's balletmaster in chief 
Priscilla Martins (born 1990), Miss Earth Brazil 2013 
Ramiro Martins (born 1941), Portuguese cyclist 
Raul Martins (born ?), former Portuguese rugby union player and coach 
Raúl Martins (born 1987), Portuguese footballer 
Renê Rodrigues Martins (born 1992), Brazilian footballer 
Ricardo Martins (born 1990), Venezuelan footballer 
Robert Martins (1822–1904), British World Checkers/Draughts Champion 
Robson José Brilhante Martins (born 1998), Brazilian footballer 
Rodinei Martins (born 1969), Brazilian former footballer 
Rodrigo Martins (born 1998), Portuguese footballer 
Rogério Gonçalves Martins (born 1984), Brazilian footballer 
Ronald Pereira Martins (born 2001), Brazilian footballer 
Rui Cardoso Martins (born 1967), Portuguese writer 
Sara Martins (born 1977), French-Portuguese actress 
Sébastien Martins (born 1985), French rugby league footballer
Sidmar Antônio Martins (born 1962), Brazilian footballer
Steve Martins (born 1972), Canadian former ice hockey player
Sylvia Martins (born 1956), Brazilian painter
Talles Magno Bacelar Martins (born 2002), Brazilian footballer
Tânia Martins (born 1957), Brazilian poet
Thiago Martins (born 1976), Brazilian former footballer
Theo Martins (born 1987), American actor and singer
Tiago Luís Martins (born 1989), Brazilian footballer
Tiago Martins (footballer, born 1987) (born 1987), Portuguese footballer
Tiago Martins (footballer, born 1998) (born 1998), Portuguese footballer
Tiago Martins (referee) (born 1980), Portuguese football referee
Tommy Joe Martins (born 1986), American stock car racing driver
Valdemar Rodrigues Martins (Oreco) (1932–1985), Brazilian footballer
Vânia Cristina Martins (born 1980), Brazilian former footballer
Vasco Martins (born 1956), Cape Verdean musician and composer
Victor Martins (born 2001), French racing driver
Vítor Martins (born 1944), Brazilian songwriter
Vítor Martins (footballer) (born 1950), Portuguese former footballer
Wagner da Conceicao Martins (born 1978), Brazilian mixed martial artist
Wallace Martins (born 1983), Brazilian volleyball player
Wellington Martins (born 1991), Brazilian footballer
Wilson Martins (born 1953), Brazilian politician
Zeferino Martins (born 1985), East Timorese footballer
Zita Martins (born 1979), Portuguese astrobiologist

Portuguese-language surnames
Patronymic surnames
Surnames from given names